Viktória Kužmová was the defending champion, but chose to participate at the 2019 Italian Open.

Bernarda Pera won the title, defeating Anna Blinkova in the final, 7–5, 7–5.

Seeds

Draw

Finals

Top half

Bottom half

References

Main Draw

Empire Slovak Open - Singles